The National Lacrosse Hall of Fame and Museum, is located in Sparks, Maryland at the USA Lacrosse headquarters. Prior to moving to its present location in 2016, the hall of fame and museum was located in Baltimore, Maryland, on the Homewood campus of Johns Hopkins University. The museum showcases the history of the game of lacrosse, from its Native American origins to its present-day form.

The first members of the National Lacrosse Hall of Fame were inducted in 1957. The museum displays photographs, art, vintage equipment and uniforms, trophies, as well as other memorabilia and artifacts relating to the sport of lacrosse.

See also
List of National Lacrosse Hall of Fame members
Canadian Lacrosse Hall of Fame

References

External links

 Museum
 Hall of Fame

Lacrosse in the United States
Lacrosse museums and halls of fame
Sports museums in Maryland
Halls of fame in Maryland